The 1997 International League season took place from April to September 1997.

The Rochester Red Wings defeated the Columbus Clippers to win the league championship.

Attendance
Charlotte Knights - 322,618
Columbus Clippers - 515,779
Norfolk Tides - 507,328
Ottawa Lynx - 266,568
Pawtucket Red Sox - 480,874
Richmond Braves - 512,727
Rochester Red Wings - 540,842
Scranton/Wilkes-Barre Red Barons - 441,413
Syracuse Chiefs - 400,804
Toledo Mud Hens - 325,532

Standings

Playoffs

Division Series
The Rochester Red Wings won the East Division Finals over the Pawtucket Red Sox, 3 games to 1.

The Columbus Clippers won the West Division Finals over the Charlotte Knights, 3 games to 1.

Championship series
The Rochester Red Wings won the Governors' Cup Finals over the Columbus Clippers, 3 games to 2.

References

External links
International League official website 

International League season
International League seasons